The Baltimore Blaze were a professional basketball team in the National Rookie League based in Baltimore, Maryland. The team is notable for winning the only NRL Championship in August 2001. With the collapse of the National Rookie League, the team ceased operations.

References

External links
Our Sports Central site

Defunct basketball teams in the United States
Sports teams in Baltimore
Basketball teams established in 2001
Defunct basketball teams in Maryland
2001 establishments in Maryland
Basketball teams disestablished in 2002
2002 disestablishments in Maryland